Cebil Redondo is a settlement in Tucumán Province in northern Argentina.

References

Populated places in Tucumán Province